Albany Hall Public School is an English-medium co-ed school located at Gorachand Road, Kolkata. The school was established in 1973 and is affiliated to ICSE and Indian School Certificate [ ISC]

References 

Schools in Kolkata
Educational institutions established in 1973
1973 establishments in West Bengal